CKEY may refer to:

CKEY-FM, a radio station (98.5 FM) licensed to Barrie, Ontario, Canada
CFLZ-FM, a radio station (101.1 FM) licensed to Fort Erie, Ontario, Canada, which held the call sign CKEY-FM from 1991 to 2011
CHKT, a radio station (1430 AM) licensed to Toronto, Ontario, Canada, which held the call sign CKEY from 1945 to 1991